Varaždinski športski nogometni klub Varaždin, commonly referred to as VŠNK Varaždin or simply Varaždin, was a Croatian football club based in the city of Varaždin in the north of the country. During its 74-year existence, they played their home matches at the Stadion Varteks, which was renovated through the years and reached an all-seating capacity of 10,800 (further renovated to seat 8,800 by sometime before 2021). For the majority of its life, the 52 years from 1958 to 2010, the club was known as NK Varteks, honouring the name of its principal sponsor during those years.

History
The club was founded on 3 June 1931 under the name of NK Slavija and existed under this name until 1941. During World War II, the club temporarily suspended operations and was then reorganised under the name of NK Tekstilac in 1945. The name NK Varteks was given to the club in 1958, to honour its main sponsor, the Varteks clothing factory (portmanteau of Varaždin Textile). In June 2010, when the Varteks factory did not renew its sponsorship, the club changed its name to NK Varaždin.

The club's first significant success came in 1938 when they qualified to participate in the premier league of the Kingdom of Yugoslavia. In SFR Yugoslavia, their biggest success was the advancement to the final of the Yugoslav Cup in 1961, but they lost the final game to Vardar Skopje from Macedonia.

In 1991, after years of Serbian nationalism had led to ethnic conflict, the breakup of Yugoslavia had started with the declaration of independence of Croatia and of Slovenia. Croatia withdrew from the Football Association of Yugoslavia, and Varaždin was one of the 12 founding members of the new Croatian First Football League (Prva Liga), which operated under the auspices of the also new Croatian Football Federation.

The club did not win any Croatian national titles, but regularly placed near the top of the Prva Liga table and were also the runners-up in the Croatian Football Cup five times. In the spring of 1999, they had a significant international success when they advanced to the quarterfinals of the now defunct UEFA Cup Winners' Cup, where they held opponent Real Mallorca to a scoreless draw at home before losing the second-leg away match 3–1, and were eliminated from competition. They also attracted some international attention in 2001, when they eliminated Aston Villa from the UEFA Cup on away goals.

Serious financial troubles forced NK Varaždin into a period of bankruptcy, which eventually led to the suspension of the club by Croatian Football Federation before a scheduled 24 February 2012 match of the 2011–12 Prva Liga season. The club returned for its next five matches, but was suspended again before its 31 March 2012 match. Per the rules of the Federation, missing two league games in a season, even those due to suspension, meant that the club was immediately relegated to the lowest football level possible of the Croatian football league system, being the seventh-tier Third League of Varaždin County. The suspension was lifted in August 2013 and the club re-entered in the third-tier Croatian Third Football League.

Seasons

Key
 League: P = Matches played; W = Matches won; D = Matches drawn; L = Matches lost; F = Goals for; A = Goals against; Pts = Points won; Pos = Final position;
 Cup / Europe: PR = Preliminary round; QR = Qualifying round; R1 = First round; R2 = Second round; Group = Group stage; QF = Quarter-final; SF = Semi-final; RU = Runner-up; W = Competition won;

European record

Summary

Source: uefa.com, Last updated on 4 August 2011Pld = Matches played; W = Matches won; D = Matches drawn; L = Matches lost; GF = Goals for; GA = Goals against. Defunct competitions indicated in italics.

By season

Honours
 Croatian Football Cup:
Runners-up (6): 1995–96, 1997–98, 2001–02, 2003–04, 2005–06, 2010–11

 Yugoslav Cup:
Runners up (1): 1960–61

 DCM Trophy:
Winners (1): 1993

Player records
Most appearances in UEFA club competitions: 27 appearances
Miljenko Mumlek
Top scorers in UEFA club competitions: 17 goals
Miljenko Mumlek

Notable players
To appear in this section a player must have:
 Played at least 150 league games for the club;
 Scored at least 50 league goals for the club; or
 Played at least one international match for their national team while playing for NK Varaždin.
Years in brackets indicate their spells at the club.

Managerial history

References

External links

NK Varaždin at UEFA.com

NK Varazdin
Association football clubs established in 1931
Association football clubs disestablished in 2015
Defunct football clubs in Croatia
Football clubs in Croatia
Football clubs in Varaždin County
Football clubs in Yugoslavia
 
1931 establishments in Croatia
2015 disestablishments in Croatia
History of Varaždin